Gettleman is a surname. Notable people with the surname include:

 Dave Gettleman (born 1951), general manager of the New York Football Giants
 Estelle Scher-Gettleman (1923–2008), actress who performed under the stage name Estelle Getty
 Jeffrey Gettleman (born 1971), American Pulitzer Prize-winning journalist for the New York Times
 Marvin Gettleman (1933–2017), American professor of leftist history
 Robert  Gettleman (born 1943), federal judge on the United States District Court for the Northern District of Illinois